Oreaster clavatus is a species of sea star that is found in the waters of the Atlantic Ocean, reportedly found from the coast of Angola to the coast of Cape Verde.

Description
Orestar clavatus is tan with dark brown specks and has 5 arms with dark brown knobs running from the center of the star to the tip of each arm, with small orange dots on each knob.

History
Oreaster clavatus was found by Franz Hermann Troschel and Johannes Peter Müller in 1842. The oldest known preserved specimen of O. Clavatus was found near Gabon in 1885 and was in the National Museum of Natural History in France.

References

Oreasteridae